Lake Kelly (October 3, 1933 – March 5, 2009) was an American college basketball coach. He served as head coach of the Austin Peay Governors and Oral Roberts Golden Eagles.

Following his coaching career, Kelly became a school administrator in Fleming County, Kentucky.

References

External links
Coaching record
College playing statistics

1933 births
2009 deaths
American men's basketball coaches
American men's basketball players
Austin Peay Governors men's basketball coaches
Basketball coaches from Kentucky
Basketball players from Kentucky
College men's basketball head coaches in the United States
Florida State Seminoles men's basketball coaches
Forwards (basketball)
Georgia Tech Yellow Jackets men's basketball players
High school basketball coaches in Kentucky
High school basketball coaches in Ohio
Loyola Wolf Pack men's basketball coaches
Morehead State Eagles men's basketball coaches
Oral Roberts Golden Eagles men's basketball coaches
People from Flemingsburg, Kentucky